Lanna is a given name. Notable people with the name include:

Lanna Commins (born 1983), Thai singer
Lanna Saunders (1941–2007), American actress

See also
 Anna (name)
 Lana (given name)
 Lanna (surname)

English feminine given names